1923 Polish Football Championship was the 4th edition of the Polish Football Championship (Non-League) and 3rd completed season ended with the selection of a winner. The championship was decided in final tournament played among eight teams (winners of the regional A-Class championship) participated in the league which was divided into 2 groups: an Eastern and a Western one. The winners of both groups, Pogoń Lwów and Wisła Kraków, played a 2 leg final match for the title (and one additional match on neutral ground in Warsaw). The champions were Pogoń Lwów, who won their 2nd Polish title.

By the PZPN decision, the next Polish championships were not to take place until 1925, because the Polish championships in 1924 were abandoned as a result of preparations of the Poland national team to participate in the 1924 Olympic Football Tournament.

Competition modus
The final tournaments started on 12 August 1923 and concluded on 4 November 1923 (spring-autumn system). In each of groups the season was played as a round-robin tournament. A total of 8 teams participated. Each team played a total of 6 matches, half at home and half away, two games against each other team. Teams received two points for a win and one point for a draw. The winners of both groups played a 2 leg final match for the title.

Final tournament tables

Eastern Group

Western Group

Final matches

Top goalscorers

References

Bibliography

External links
 Poland – List of final tables at RSSSF 
 List of Polish football championships 
 List of Polish football championships 

Polish Football Championship, 1923
Polish Football Championship, 1923
Polish
Polish
Seasons in Polish football competitions